The dusky shiner (Notropis cummingsae) is a species of cyprinid fish in the genus Notropis. It is endemic to the United States, where it is found in the lower Tar River drainage, North Carolina, south to Altamaha River drainage in  Georgia, the St. Johns River drainage in Florida, and the Aucilla River drainage to Choctawhatchee River drainage, Florida, Georgia, and Alabama.

References 
Notes

Sources
 Robert Jay Goldstein, Rodney W. Harper, Richard Edwards: American Aquarium Fishes. Texas A&M University Press 2000, p. 101
 

Notropis
Fish described in 1925